= Latawan =

Village in Maharashtra

- Village
- Interactive map of Latawan
- Country: India
- State: Maharashtra

Latawan is a small village in Ratnagiri district, Maharashtra state in Western India. The 2011 Census of India recorded a total of 1,307 residents in the village. Latawan's geographical area is 304 hectares (750 acres).
